Gareth Owen Roberts FRS (born 1964) is a statistician and applied probabilist. He is Professor of Statistics in the Department of Statistics and Director of the Centre for Research in Statistical Methodology (CRiSM) at the University of Warwick. He is an established authority on the stability of Markov chains, especially applied to Markov chain Monte Carlo (MCMC) theory methodology for a wide range of latent statistical models with applications in spatial statistics, infectious disease epidemiology and finance.

Education
Roberts was educated at Jesus College, Oxford, graduating in 1985 in Mathematics and subsequently went on to complete in 1988 a PhD thesis on Some boundary hitting problems for diffusion processes  under the supervision of Saul Jacka at the University of Warwick.

Career
Following his PhD, Roberts held various academic positions at the University of Nottingham, the University of Cambridge and Lancaster University before returning to the University of Warwick. He was a Fellow of St Catharine's College, Cambridge from 1992 to 1998.

Roberts is a talented tournament bridge player, whose achievements include winning the Great Northern Swiss Pairs in 1997, and the Garden Cities Trophy in 2008 and 2013.

Awards and honours
1995 – Raybould Fellowship
1997 – Royal Statistical Society's Guy medal in Bronze
1999 – Rollo Davidson Prize of the University of Cambridge
2004 – ISI highly cited researcher (Mathematics: Ranked 16th )
2008 – Royal Statistical Society's Guy medal in Silver
2009 – Institute of Mathematical Statistics Medallion
2010 – Editor of Journal of the Royal Statistical Society (Series B)
2013 – Elected a Fellow of the Royal Society

His nomination to become a Fellow of the Royal Society (FRS) in 2013 reads:

2015 – Wolfson Research Merit Award from the Royal Society

References

Living people
English statisticians
Alumni of the University of Warwick
Alumni of Jesus College, Oxford
Fellows of St Catharine's College, Cambridge
Fellows of the Royal Society
Academics of the University of Nottingham
Date of birth missing (living people)
1964 births
Mathematical statisticians
Computational statisticians